Ibrahim Shameel (born October 14, 1991), widely known as Kaneeru is a Maldivian swimmer. He competed at the 2008 Summer Olympics.

External links
 
Ibrahim Shameel

Living people
Swimmers at the 2008 Summer Olympics
Olympic swimmers of the Maldives
Maldivian male swimmers
1991 births
Place of birth missing (living people)
21st-century Maldivian people